Airtransivoire (ATI) was an airline in Côte d'Ivoire. It was founded in 1973. In 1979, all operations ceased.

See also		
 List of defunct airlines of Côte d'Ivoire

External links 
Airline History

Airlines established in 1973
Airlines disestablished in 1979
Defunct airlines of Ivory Coast